Robert McPherson (1 January 1864 – 13 October 1904) was a New Zealand cricketer. He played three first-class matches for Auckland in 1889/90.

See also
 List of Auckland representative cricketers

References

External links
 

1864 births
1904 deaths
New Zealand cricketers
Auckland cricketers
Cricketers from Christchurch